Chairo (feminine chaira) is a pejorative epithet that originated in Mexico to describe an individual who holds a far-left ideology, specifically any person who thoughtlessly defends, idolizes, and fawns over a populist politician and demagogue with an attitude similar to that of a religious fanatic.

Similar terms in other Spanish-speaking countries include perroflautas in Spain, zurdos in Argentina and comunachos in Chile.

Etymology 
In the 1960s, a chairo or chaqueto was a term used to refer to an adolescent who was believed to masturbate in excess and as a result was self-absorbed or distracted.
The words have connection to chaqueta mental, literally mental jerk-off.

In her blog at El Universal, prominent blogger Tamara De Anda relates how she and her friends first tried to popularize chairo in high school to describe "neo-hippie" students that would take up camp in the best part of the school's garden. She describes these students as beautiful and self-assured, that they wore fashionable clothes, went to raves and took acid and MDMA. Although they came from nice homes in the south of Mexico City (see Jardines del Pedregal and San Ángel). De Anda and her friends would mock these students as elitists and fake as they claimed to be left-wing whilst going to protests in their best clothes. At this point to de Anda, the chairo was viewed as cool for the things that their wealth provided them. The word started to acquire its current meaning in the mid 2000s. De Anda gave new impetus to the word circa 2004 when she began to use it in her blog, Plaqueta, and to jokingly describe her left-leaning friends.

In 2005, while de Anda attended the Facultad de Ciencias Políticas y Sociales, she created a satirical documentary titled Los Chairos which consisted of interviews with the "chairos" of Mexico City. The popularity of her blog helped increase views for the video and helped disseminate the term. Chairo then began to deform from describing something cool and fun to a word used to indicate and mock those who were demonstrating against the system. De Anda self-describes as a chaira and has expressed discontent with the word's usage to denigrate dissenting views.

Stereotype 
The term has been further popularized by social media and now encompasses a large array of attributes. Most commonly seen as a 20-something college student, the term has also been extended to journalists, academics, writers and artists.

Common traits attributed to the chairo include: an expansive leftist-anarchist ideology, some sort of nationalist view (sometimes grounded on indigenismo, i.e. demonizing or minimizing Mexico's Hispanic heritage and exalting everything "Aztec"), being indignant and fighting "the System" and globalization. They may be against what they believe to be "Zionism" and "American imperialism". A chairo is sometimes seen as a radical that sympathizes with Socialism that is in line with Chavismo.

Other stereotypes include wearing Che Guevara shirts and smoking marijuana or ingesting peyote. As well as adhering to the philosophy of Noam Chomsky and reading the works of Eduardo Galeano.

According to the Diccionario del español de México, compiled by the Colegio de México, a chairo is an offensive adjective used to describe individuals that defend social and political causes that are in contrast with the political right, however they lack real commitment to the causes defended; an individual that is self-satisfied with their own attitudes.

A picture of writer Daniel Malpica (editor of Radiador Magazine) became a popular image macro of the "typical chairo".

See also
Hipster (contemporary subculture)- similar in meaning to de Anda's original usage of chairo

References

External links 
 Los chairos at the Internet Movie Database
 Texto sin pies ni cabeza sobre los hipsters post at El Universal where de Anda relates her usage of the term in high school

2000s slang
Mexican slang
Political slurs for people
Political terminology
Far-left politics in Mexico